Amina Al Rustamani is an Emirati businesswoman who's currently the director of family business AW Rostamani Group. She ranked number 9 in the CEO Middle East's fifth annual list of the world's most powerful Arab women in 2015. She was picked as the Advertising Person of the Year by Dubai Lynx for 2015.

Al Rustamani started her career in Dubai in 2001 as an electrical engineer with TECOM Investments (now TECOM Group), becoming one of few women in the Middle East to enter the profession. She received her bachelor's, master's and doctoral degrees in electrical engineering from The George Washington University in 1993, 1996, and 2001, respectively. More recently, Amina was involved in the development of Dubai Design District and Dubai Wholesale City.

Al Rustamani left TECOM Group in February 2018 to take up the reins in her family business. She was listed as number 20 in Forbes "Middle East Power Businesswomen 2021."

Career (current)
 Chief Executive Officer of AWR Properties 
 Director and board member of AW Rostamani Group
Board Member of Dubai Healthcare City Authority
Board Member of Noor Bank
Board Member of HSBC Bank Middle East

Career (former) 

 Group Chief Executive Officer of TECOM Group
 Chairperson of the Dubai Design and Fashion Council
 Member of the Board, Dubai Media Incorporated
 Member of the Board, National Media Council
 Member of the Board, Emirates Central Cooling Systems Corporation (Empower)

References

External links
 Dr. Amina Al Rustamani
TECOM Group, Management Team

Women business executives
Living people
People from Dubai
Year of birth missing (living people)
Emirati business executives
George Washington University School of Engineering and Applied Science alumni
Women chief executives